The 14553/54 Delhi–Daulatpur Chowk Himachal Express is an Express train belonging to Indian Railways – Northern Railway zone that runs between  & Daulatpur Chowk in Una, Himachal Pradesh, India.

It operates as train number 14553 from Delhi to Daulatpur Chowk and as train number 14554 in the reverse direction, serving the states of Himachal Pradesh & Delhi.

It is named after the Indian state of Himachal Pradesh  & like most trains such as Kerala Express, Tamil Nadu Express, Telangana Express which are named after the states they serve, it connects the state to the National Capital.

Coaches

The 14553 / 54 Himachal Express has 1 AC 1st Class cum AC 2 tier, 1 AC 2 tier, 2 AC 3 tier, 2 Sleeper class, 8 Unreserved/General & 2 Seating cum Luggage Rake Coaches. It does not carry a pantry car .

As is customary with most train services in India, coach composition may be amended at the discretion of Indian Railways depending on demand.

Service

As the average speed of the train is below , as per Indian Railways rules, its fare does not include a Superfast surcharge.

Routeing

Rajpura,
,Rupnagar,  to Daulatpur Chowk.

Traction

Operation

14553 Delhi–Daulatpur Chowk Himachal Express runs from Delhi on a daily basis reaching Daulatpur Chowk the next day.

14554 Daulatpur Chowk–Delhi Himachal Express runs from Daulatpur Chowk on a daily basis reaching 
Delhi the next day.

Rake sharing

14553 / 54 Himachal Express shares its rake with the 14555 / 56 Delhi–Bareilly Express.

References

External links

 https://www.tribuneindia.com/news/himachal/himachal-express-to-run-between-delhi-daulatpur-chowk/714431.html

Transport in Delhi
Named passenger trains of India
Rail transport in Delhi
Rail transport in Haryana
Rail transport in Punjab, India
Rail transport in Himachal Pradesh
Express trains in India